Eveline Peleman (born 1993) from Ghent , Belgium is an elite rower. She was the 2014 World Champion in the women's lightweight 1x in Amsterdam.
After winning the Lightweight women's single scull (LW1x) in Amsterdam.  She started rowing back in 2005 at Royal Sport Nautique de Gand. This club was the first foreign Grand Challenge Cup winner and participated several times in the Thames Challenge Cup contest. Eveline also got a bronze medal in the  2014 World Rowing U23 Championships.

References

External links
 2014 World Rowing Championship, WL1x Final
 

1993 births
Living people
Belgian female rowers
Flemish sportspeople
Rowers from Ghent
Rowers at the 2010 Summer Youth Olympics

World Rowing Championships medalists for Belgium
21st-century Belgian women